= South of the River =

South of the River is the name of many places, usually in an urban region:

- In the UK city of London, it is the name for South London which is south of the River Thames
- In the US state of Minnesota, it is the name for suburbs south of the Minnesota River in Minneapolis-St. Paul including most of Burnsville, Eagan, Apple Valley, Savage, Prior Lake in Dakota County
- In Perth, Western Australia, it refers to suburbs south of the Swan River
- In Leeds, It is the name for the South Leeds suburbs and districts that are south of the River Aire such as Beeston, Hunslet, Morley and Middleton
